Julie Anne Robenhymer (born February 24, 1981) is Miss New Jersey 2005, and a blogger for the website hockeybuzz.com.

Biography
Robenhymer won the title of Miss New Jersey in 2005 and participated in Miss America 2006 on January 21, 2006.

Robenhymer is from Moorestown Township, New Jersey, near Philadelphia, and grew up following the Philadelphia Flyers hockey team. She attended the University of Massachusetts Amherst, graduating in 2003 with degrees in journalism and sports management.

On September 21, 2007, Robenhymer was named a blogger for hockeybuzz.com, where she covers college hockey.
On March 22, 2013, she was named as a columnist for the biggest ice hockey site in Sweden, hockeysverige.se, where she covers NHL. She also writes articles for the official website of the New Jersey Devils.

References

External links
 

Miss America 2006 delegates
1981 births
Living people
People from Moorestown, New Jersey
American sports journalists
Isenberg School of Management alumni